The Dream is a 1989 television film directed by Norman Stone and starring Jeremy Irons. It was adapted by Murray Watts from an 1877 short story by Fyodor Dostoyevsky called "The Dream of a Ridiculous Man". Irons is the sole speaking cast member; he is a character simply known as The Man who performs a monologue.

References

External links 
 

1989 television films
1989 films
Films based on works by Fyodor Dostoyevsky
British television films